Praeger may refer to:

 The surname Praeger or its variants, see Prager (disambiguation)
 Praeger Publishing, a division of Greenwood Publishing Group